is a professional Japanese baseball player. He plays infielder for the Yokohama DeNA BayStars.

References 

1993 births
Living people
Baseball people from Chiba Prefecture
People from Kimitsu
Japanese baseball players
Nippon Professional Baseball infielders
Yokohama DeNA BayStars players